Jackson Donald Fleck (November 7, 1921 – March 21, 2014) was an American professional golfer, best known for winning the U.S. Open in 1955 in a playoff over Ben Hogan.

Early years
Born in 1921 and raised in Bettendorf, Iowa, Fleck's parents were poor farmers who had lost their land in the 1920s. He attended Davenport High School and played on its golf team. Fleck started as a caddie for a local dentist in the mid-1930s, turned professional in 1939, and worked as an assistant golf pro at the Des Moines Country Club for five dollars a week prior to World War II. He joined the military in 1942 and served in the U.S. Navy as a quartermaster; he  participated in the D-Day invasion from a British rocket-firing ship off Normandy's Utah Beach. Within two weeks after his discharge from the service, Fleck was on the PGA's winter golf tour with pro friends trying to qualify for PGA Tour events.

Pro career
After a few years of competing in local and PGA Tour events, Fleck decided to play full-time on the Tour for two years. Within six months, Fleck had his first win — on the biggest stage in men's professional golf — at the 1955 U.S. Open. Fleck won an 18-hole Sunday playoff by three strokes over his idol, Ben Hogan, at the Olympic Club in San Francisco. His first round deficit of nine strokes (behind Tommy Bolt), was the greatest number overcome by a U.S. Open winner. The following year he resigned his job as a municipal club pro in Davenport and moved to the Detroit area in October 1956.

Fleck made three playoffs on tour in 1960, winning at the Phoenix Open in February. He tied for third at the U.S. Open in 1960, and won his third and last tour event in October 1961, The Bakersfield Open, also in a playoff. Fleck finished in the top ten at the PGA Championship in 1962 at Aronimink near Philadelphia, a tie for seventh, then left the tour in 1963. He was a club pro in Wisconsin, Illinois, and California (Plumas Lake CC), and attempted a comeback on tour in 1970. Following the death of his wife Lynn in 1975, he qualified for the U.S. Open in 1977 at age 55, but missed the cut.

Less than two years later, Fleck won the PGA Seniors' Championship in February 1979, also won in a playoff, a year prior to the formation of the Senior PGA Tour. He was inducted into the Iowa Golf Hall of Fame in 1990.

In 1993, needing money to salvage a little golf course he owned in rural Arkansas that had been damaged by flooding, a place he called Li'l Bit of Heaven, he sold his 1955 U.S. Open gold medal. He lived in Fort Smith, Arkansas with his wife Carmen Fleck.

Personal
Fleck met his first wife, Lynn Burnsdale of Chicago, when she stopped in the municipal course's pro shop in Davenport in 1949 with a club that needed repair. They were married six weeks later and late the next year added their only child, a son. Fleck wanted to name him Snead Hogan Fleck, but they settled on Craig, after Craig Wood, the winner of the Masters and U.S. Open in 1941. Lynn is credited with encouraging him to play on tour in the early 1950s and again in the early 1970s. She died in 1975 and Fleck remarried in 1980. He married his wife Carmen in 2001. He died on March 21, 2014, in Fort Smith, Arkansas, at the age of 92. He was the oldest living U.S. Open champion at the time of his death.

Professional wins (9)

PGA Tour wins (3)

PGA Tour playoff record (3–2)

Other wins (4)
1952 RGCC Shelden Invitational
1954 RGCC Shelden Invitational
1964 Illinois PGA Championship
1965 Illinois Open Championship

Senior wins (2)
1979 PGA Seniors' Championship
1995 Liberty Mutual Legends of Golf - Demaret Division (with Tommy Bolt)

Major championships

Wins (1)

1 Defeated Hogan in an 18-hole playoff – Fleck 69 (–1), Hogan 72 (+2).

Results timeline

Note: Fleck never played The Open Championship.

CUT = missed the half-way cut (3rd round cut in 1960 PGA Championship)
DQ = disqualified
WD = withdrew
R64, R32, R16, QF, SF = Round in which player lost in PGA Championship match play
"T" = tied

Summary

Most consecutive cuts made – 5 (three times)
Longest streak of top-10s – 2 (1955 U.S. Open – 1955 PGA)

U.S. national team appearances
Hopkins Trophy: 1956 (winners)

References

Further reading

External links 
 Google Books Bettendorf Iowa's Exciting City published 2000

American male golfers
PGA Tour golfers
PGA Tour Champions golfers
Winners of men's major golf championships
Golfers from Iowa
Golfers from Arkansas
People from Bettendorf, Iowa
Sportspeople from Fort Smith, Arkansas
United States Navy sailors
United States Navy personnel of World War II
Burials at Fort Smith National Cemetery
1921 births
2014 deaths